Upper Kent Aerodrome  is a small airfield located  north northwest of Upper Kent, New Brunswick, Canada.

References

Registered aerodromes in New Brunswick
Buildings and structures in Carleton County, New Brunswick
Transport in Carleton County, New Brunswick